Honey Rose Varghese is an Indian actress who mainly appears in Malayalam films. She has also appeared in a few Tamil, Kannada and Telugu films. She made her acting debut with the 2005 Malayalam film Boyy Friennd. Her breakthrough role came in 2012 with Trivandrum Lodge..Honey has established herself as leading actress in Malayalam cinema.She made her official Telugu Entry through Veera Simha Reddy (2023), which became a Blockbuster.

Early life 
Honey Rose Varghese was born in Kerala at Moolamattom in a Syro-Malabar Catholic family. Shes of mixed Indian and Assyrian orgin. She was educated at S.H.E.M High School, Moolamattom. She holds a Bachelor of Arts degree in Communicative English from the St. Xavier's College for Women, Aluva.

Career 
Starting her career at age 14 in 2005, she acted in the Malayalam film Boyy Friennd directed by Vinayan. She played the role of Manikuttan's friend. In 2006, she accepted her first non-Malayalam project, Ee Varsham Sakshiga in Telugu, which was followed by her first Tamil film the romantic drama Mudhal Kanave. Honey Rose acted in Muthyala Subbiah's 50th film Aalayam.

Her comeback character is that of 'Dhwani Nambiar' in Trivandrum Lodge, it gave her a breakthrough in her career. She decided to change her screen name to Dhwani after that film, but reverted to Honey Rose in Anju Sundarikal.

In 2011 she had completed one Tamil project, Mallukattu which she signed in 2009 and a Malayalam film, Pithavinum Puthranum Parishudhatmavinum, but the latter is on hold. She plays a nun called Sister Elsita in director Deepesh's Pithavinum Puthranum Parisudhalmavinum. She also acted with Jayasurya in Hotel California and in Thank You as Jayasurya's wife, with Fahadh in the 5 Sundarikal featurette called Aami and Daivathinte Swantham Cleetus with Mammootty in which she plays a bold and strong Malayali woman.

In 2015, she played Shirley, an aspiring singer and model, who falls in love with a married man in You Too Brutus. She starred in the notable films such as  Daivathinte Swantham Cleetus with Mammooty,  My God with Suresh Gopi, Kanal, Ittymaani: Made in China and Big Brother with Mohanlal, Sir C. P. with Jayaram,  and Ring Master with Dileep.

Honey Rose returned to Tamil cinema after a gap of eight years with Pattaampoochi (2022), starring Sundar C. and Jai. Then she acted in Monster directed by Vysakh starring Mohanlal and her performance in the film was well acclaimed. In 2023, she appeared in Telugu film Veera Simha Reddy starring Nandamuri Balakrishna which was her return to Telugu cinema after a gap of nine years.

Filmography

Film

Television
 Flowers Oru Kodi (2022) as Participant
 Comedy Festival as Judge
 Thakarppan Comedy as Mentor

References

External links 
 

Indian film actresses
Actresses in Kannada cinema
Living people
People from Idukki district
Actresses in Tamil cinema
Actresses from Kerala
21st-century Indian actresses
Actresses in Malayalam cinema
Actresses in Telugu cinema
Year of birth missing (living people)